Robert Davis House may refer to:

in the United States
Robert Davis Farmhouse, Millsboro, Delaware, listed on the NRHP in Sussex County, Delaware
Robert S. Davis House, Brookline, Massachusetts, listed on the NRHP in Norfolk County, Massachusetts

See also
Davis House (disambiguation)